The Pessoa Prize, named after Fernando Pessoa, is recognized as the most important award in the area of Portuguese culture. Created in 1987 by the newspaper Expresso and the IT company Unisys, since 2008 the prize has been sponsored by Caixa Geral de Depósitos.  It is granted annually to the Portuguese person who during this period, and in the course of previous activity, has distinguished him or herself as a figure in scientific, artistic, or literary life.

List of prize winners
 1987 – José Mattoso, historian
 1988 – António Ramos Rosa, poet
 1989 – Maria João Pires, pianist
 1990 – Menez, painter
 1991 – Cláudio Torres, archaeologist
 1992 – António Damásio and Hanna Damásio, neurophysiologists
 1993 – Fernando Gil, philosopher and poet
 1994 – Herberto Helder, poet – refused the award
 1995 – Vasco Graça Moura, essayist
 1996 – João Lobo Antunes, neurosurgeon
 1997 – José Cardoso Pires, writer
 1998 – Eduardo Souto de Moura, architect
 1999 – Manuel Alegre, poet, and José Manuel Rodrigues, photographer
 2000 – Emmanuel Nunes, composer
 2001 – João Bénard da Costa, president of the Cinemateca Portuguesa—Museu do Cinema, and a film historian
 2002 – Manuel Sobrinho Simões, scientist (medicine)
 2003 – José Gomes Canotilho, constitutionalist
 2004 – Mário Cláudio, writer
 2005 – Luís Miguel Cintra, actor and set designer
 2006 – António Câmara, professor and founder of the YDreams IT firm
 2007 – Irene Flunser Pimentel, historian
 2008 – Carrilho da Graça, architect
 2009 – Manuel Clemente, Catholic Church prelate 
 2010 – Maria do Carmo Fonseca, scientist and Professor of the School of Medicine of Santa Maria
 2011 – Eduardo Lourenço, essayist
 2012 – Richard Zenith, writer and translator
 2013 – Maria Manuel Mota, scientist (biomedicine)
 2014 – Henrique Leitão, Physicist, Professor and researcher in the field of History of Sciences 
 2015 – Rui Chafes, sculptor
 2016 – Frederico Lourenço, writer and translator
 2017 – Manuel Aires Mateus, architect
 2018 – Miguel Bastos Araújo, scientist (biogeographer)
 2019 – Tiago Rodrigues, theatre director
 2020 – Elvira Fortunato, scientist (engineering)
 2021 - Tiago Pitta e Cunha, jurist specialized in ocean issues

See also 

 List of general science and technology awards

References

External links
 Prémio Pessoa

Awards established in 1987
Portuguese awards
Fernando Pessoa